Stanisław Marian Ryłko (born 4 July 1945) is a Polish Cardinal of the Roman Catholic Church. He held positions in the Roman Curia beginning in 1987 and was president of the Pontifical Council for the Laity from 2003 to 2016. He was made a cardinal in 2007. He has been Archpriest of the Basilica of Santa Maria Maggiore since 28 December 2016.

Besides his native Polish, he speaks Italian, English, and German.

Early life and pastoral work
Stanisław Ryłko was born in Andrychów to Władysław and Aurelia Ryłko. He has two siblings: a brother, Władysław (d. 2007), and a sister, Jadwiga. He graduated from the Lyceum of Maria Skłodowska-Curie in Andrychów in 1963 before entering the seminary in Kraków, later obtaining his licentiate in moral theology. Ryłko then studied at the Pontifical Gregorian University, where he earned his doctorate in social sciences. He was ordained to the priesthood by Cardinal Karol Wojtyła (later Pope John Paul II) on 30 March 1969 in Wawel Cathedral, and then did pastoral work in Poronin until 1971.

Ryłko served as vice-rector of the Kraków seminary before teaching practical theology at the Pontifical Theological Academy of Kraków. He was secretary of the lay apostolate commission of the Polish Episcopal Conference as well. In 1987, he returned to Rome and was charged with responsibility for the section for the Catholic Youth Work of the Pontifical Council for the Laity; during this time, he organized the World Youth Day events of 1989 and 1991. He was transferred to the Polish section of the Vatican Secretariat of State in 1992.

Bishop
On 20 December 1995, Pope John Paul II appointed Ryłko secretary of the Pontifical Council for the Laity and Titular Bishop of Novica. He received his episcopal consecration on 6 January 1996 in St. Peter's Basilica from John Paul II, with Archbishops Giovanni Re and Jorge Mejía serving as co-consecrators. As Secretary, Ryłko served as the second-highest official of that dicastery under Eduardo Francisco Pironio and James Stafford.

He was named President of the Pontifical Council for the Laity on 4 October 2003. Following the death of John Paul II on 2 April 2005, Pope Benedict XVI confirmed him in that position on 21 April 2005.

Cardinal
In the consistory of 24 November 2007, Pope Benedict created him Cardinal-Deacon of Sacro Cuore di Cristo Re.

On 12 June 2008 he was appointed by Benedict as a member of several congregations in the Roman Curia: the Congregation for the Causes of Saints, Congregation for Bishops and the Pontifical Commission for Latin America. On 5 January 2011 he was named one of the first members of the new Pontifical Council for the Promotion of the New Evangelisation. On 10 March 2015, Pope Francis appointed Rylko a Member of the Pontifical Committee for International Eucharistic Congresses.

He was one of the cardinal electors who participated in the 2013 papal conclave that elected Pope Francis.

His tenure as head of the Pontifical Council on the Laity ended on 1 September 2016 when its functions were taken over by the new Dicastery for the Laity, Family and Life.

On 28 December 2016, Pope Francis appointed Rylko Archpriest of the Basilica of Santa Maria Maggiore. On 11 August 2018, he was named a member of the Pontifical Commission for Vatican City State.

Views
In 2008, in an address to the plenary assembly of the Congregation for the Laity, Ryłko said that the time has come for Christians to free themselves from their false inferiority complex against the so-called secular world, to be courageous disciples of Christ.

References

External links
 
Cardinals of the Holy Roman Church
Catholic-Hierarchy

1945 births
People from Andrychów
Pontifical Gregorian University alumni
21st-century Polish cardinals
Living people
Pontifical Council for the Laity
Cardinals created by Pope Benedict XVI
Grand Crosses with Star and Sash of the Order of Merit of the Federal Republic of Germany
Members of the Pontifical Council for the Promotion of the New Evangelisation
Members of the Congregation for the Causes of Saints
Members of the Congregation for Bishops